The 55th Massachusetts Infantry Regiment was the sister regiment of the renowned Massachusetts 54th Volunteers during the latter half of the American Civil War. The enactment of the Emancipation Proclamation by United States President Abraham Lincoln on January 1, 1863 had opened the way for the enlistment of free men of color and newly liberated slaves to fight for their freedom within the Union Army. As the ranks of the 54th Massachusetts quickly reached its full complement of recruits, an overflow of colored volunteers continued to pour in from several other states outside Massachusetts — many of whom simply had not arrived in time — prompting Governor John Albion Andrew to authorize yet another regiment of colored soldiers sponsored by the Commonwealth. Lieutenant Colonel Norwood P. Hallowell of the 54th Massachusetts was promoted to colonel and appointed commander of the 55th Massachusetts on May 30, 1863.  Five companies of the 55th Massachusetts were mustered into service on May 31; two more companies were mustered in on June 15; and the last three on June 22. 

Although Union forces had achieved a victory at the Battle of Antietam in September 1862, two years of war had taken a great toll in men and resources. Yet, in spite of this, free men of color remained largely excluded from taking up arms as soldiers in the defense of the Union and their own continued liberty. In his Pulitzer Prize–winning book Battle Cry of Freedom, noted historian James M. McPherson wrote: "Despite the service of black soldiers in the [American] Revolution and the War of 1812, Negroes had been barred from state militias since 1792 and the regular army had never enrolled black soldiers. The prejudices of the old order died hard." In a speech delivered on March 21, 1863, the great abolitionist orator Frederick Douglass recounted how he had "...implored the imperiled nation to unchain against her foes, her powerful black hand." Under the leadership of Governor Andrew, the Commonwealth of Massachusetts took decisive action to do just that. Both the 54th and the 55th regiments were mustered in at Camp Meigs in Readville, Massachusetts, near Boston, and were trained there in that camp. The two regiments ultimately brigaded together, fighting and dying side by side during the campaign at Honey Hill, South Carolina, on November 30, 1864. It was from the 54th Massachusetts that officers Norwood Penrose Hallowell and Alfred Stedman Hartwell were promoted and mustered in as Colonel and Lieutenant Colonel, respectively, to lead the newly formed regiment, with Charles Barnard Fox of the 2nd Massachusetts Cavalry mustered in as major. Together with the 2nd and 3rd North Carolina Colored Volunteers (which later became renumbered as the 36th and 37th U.S. Colored Troops respectively), it was a part of "Wild's African Brigade" led by Edward A. Wild for much of the war.

Following departure from Boston for North Carolina and before seeing action in battle, Colonel Hallowell took a furlough to the north in order to seek treatment of a severe wound he had suffered at Antietam, and ultimately resigned his commission never to return to active duty.  In turn, officers Hartwell and Fox were promoted to lead the regiment as Colonel and Lt. Colonel, respectively, with Sigourney Wales mustered in as major. Coincidentally, the newly formed regiment received its regimental colors from Governor Andrew on July 18, 1863, the very day that the Massachusetts 54th launched its fateful assault on Fort Wagner at Morris Island, South Carolina.

Due to the Commonwealth's relatively small black population, both the 54th Massachusetts and, subsequently, the 55th Massachusetts, were made up of free men of color recruited from other states, including Ohio, New York, and Pennsylvania. The State of Ohio provided 222 recruits to the 55th Massachusetts, more than any other northern state. Among these was James Monroe Trotter of Chillicothe, Ohio, father of William Monroe Trotter, an early civil rights activist and a co-founder of the Niagara Movement, the direct predecessor to the NAACP. William Monroe Trotter was also a graduate of Harvard University and numbered among the 100 Greatest African Americans as compiled by Molefi Kete Asante, Ph.D.

At the time of formation, the colored troops of Massachusetts were promised a pay rate of $13.00 per month, equal to that of all other active recruits throughout the Union Army.  This promise was not initially honored, principally due to inaction of the U.S. Congress. On principle, these men almost unanimously chose to forgo their pay altogether until this discrepancy was fully rectified. And according to the Civil War Index: "Like the 54th, a grave injustice was done the men of the 55th in the matter of pay, as the Federal paymasters offered the men but $10 a month. This, they consistently refused to accept, and serious trouble with the men was narrowly averted in consequence." By one account, James Monroe Trotter "was the first soldier to step forth and say to the paymaster 'No, sir; we'll never take it. We are soldiers, we will accept nothing less than the soldier's pay. We are perfectly willing to take the soldier's fare, but we will not degrade the name of an American soldier.'" This circumstance persisted for a period of eighteen months before the matter was finally settled through action taken by the War Department.

In her 1995 article 'History of 55th Massachusetts Volunteer Infantry', Civil War historian Katherine Dhalle stated the following:
"The war that had taken so many lives had also seen fit to form many survivors into the leaders of a new, reunited country. Despite frustrations, disappointments, obstacles, and restrictions, the men of the 55th bore their military office well. Instead of retreating in the face of adversity, whether it be the enemy, their fellow officers, or their own government, they continued in their quest to promote freedom and preserve the Union at all costs. For this they deserve our unending respect and admiration. As well, the brave men of the regiment, both black and white, who fought side by side, and lived through the inequities of a discriminatory government, deserve to be remembered as the heroes they are. Nothing less would be acceptable."

Notable soldiers and officers

 Colonel Norwood P. Hallowell
 Lieutenant James Monroe Trotter had been mustered in to the regiment as a private, promoted to sergeant major and ultimately attaining the rank of 2nd lieutenant, one of first men of color to receive a commission in U.S. Military during the Civil War. Trotter traced his family ancestry back to Monticello, the Virginia plantation home of President Thomas Jefferson. Sergeants John Freeman Shorter and William Dupree, both men of color, were also mustered into the regiment as 2nd Lieutenants. However, despite these notable achievements, Lt. J.M. Trotter wrote: "There is much feeling in the Regiment among the officers against these promotions of colored men in Regiments with white officers; but all the best officers are in favor of it...Some talk of resigning on account of these promotions. I cannot say that they will do so...I do not know how it will all turn out, but Dupree and I will try to do our duty as officers let prejudice be as great as it may." Echoing these sentiments, Lt. John F. Shorter in reading the regiment's resolutions, called upon his fellow brave soldiers of color to fulfill their first duty as men, to "prove our fitness for liberty and citizenship, in the new order of things now arising in this, our native land."
 Joshua Dunbar, a former slave and father of renowned American poet Paul Laurence Dunbar, served in both the 55th Massachusetts and the 5th Regiment, Massachusetts Cavalry (Colored). In honor of newly liberated slaves and free men of color who fought and died in defense of nationhood and freedom, Paul Lawrence Dunbar would pen two poems, entitled "The Colored Soldiers" and "When Dey 'Listed Colored Soldiers."
 George Thompson Garrison, eldest son of internationally acclaimed American abolitionist William Lloyd Garrison, enlisted in the Fifty-fifth Colored Regiment of Massachusetts Volunteers and mustered in as a 2nd lieutenant, ultimately attaining the rank of captain.
 Captain Charles Pickering Bowditch, later financier, archaeologist, cryptographer and linguist
 Thomas F. Ellsworth (Company B), received a Medal of Honor for carrying his injured superior officer from the Battle of Honey Hill.
 Second Lieutenant Ezra Palmer Gould, later an Episcopal priest
 Second Lieutenant Charles Lewis Mitchell, later one of the first two African Americans to serve in the Massachusetts state legislature
 Captain William Nutt, later politician and banker
 Corporal Andrew Jackson Smith (Medal of Honor), received a Medal of Honor for taking and keeping the colors after the color bearer fell at the Battle of Honey Hill.
 Surgeon Burt Green Wilder
 Matthew M. Lewey, judge, state rep., mayor, publisher, editor, and militia leader in Florida.

See also
 List of Massachusetts Civil War units
 Freedman
 Abolitionism in New Bedford, Massachusetts
 Frederick Douglass

Notes

References

External links

 History of the 55th Massachusetts Volunteer Infantry
 The 55th Massachusetts: The Other "Glory" Regiment
 Louisiana and Massachusetts – Mr. Abraham Lincoln and Freedom, The Lincoln Institute
          55th Massachusetts Infantry Regiment (1863–1865)
  The Civil War's Black Soldier
 NPS, Battle Unit Details: 55th Regiment, Massachusetts Infantry (Colored)
 Photograph of members of the 55th Massachusetts Infantry
 Association of Officers of the 55th Massachusetts Infantry Regiment Carte de Visite Album
 FamilySearch: 55th Regiment, Massachusetts Infantry (Colored)

Units and formations of the Union Army from Massachusetts
African-American military units and formations of the American Civil War
Military units and formations disestablished in 1865
Military units and formations established in 1863
1863 establishments in Massachusetts